Rain Or Shine is an album from Dick Haymes. Released in 1956 and with musical direction by Ian Bernard plus Johnny Mandel on Love Is Here To Stay and Come Rain Or Come Shine.

Track listing

Recording musicians
 Harold Arlen	Composer
 Irving Berlin	Composer
 Ian Bernard	Conductor, Primary Artist
 Hoagy Carmichael	Composer
 Howard Dietz	Composer
 Walter Donaldson	Composer
 George Gershwin	Composer
 Ira Gershwin	Composer
 Mack Gordon	Composer
 Oscar Hammerstein II	Composer
 Lorenz Hart	Composer
 Dick Haymes	Primary Artist, Vocals
 Herman Leonard	Cover Photo
 Johnny Mercer	Composer
 Ray Noble	Composer
 Richard Rodgers	Composer
 Arthur Schwartz	Composer
 Harry Warren	Composer
 Ned Washington	Composer

Sources 
The booklet of the CD collection: The Complete Capitol Collection, written by Ruth Prigozy and Ken Barnes.

Dick Haymes albums
1955 albums
Capitol Records albums